Lake Johanna Township is a township in Pope County, Minnesota, United States. The population was 151 at the 2000 census.

History 
Lake Johanna Township was organized in 1867. The original federal land survey of the township was completed in 1867.

Geography

Demographics
As of the census of 2000, there were 151 people, 64 households, and 43 families residing in the township. The population density was 4.6 people per square mile (1.8/km2). There were 97 housing units at an average density of 2.9/sq mi (1.1/km2). The racial makeup of the township was 98.01% White, and 1.99% from two or more races.

There were 64 households, out of which 25.0% had children under the age of 18 living with them, 60.9% were married couples living together, 4.7% had a female householder with no husband present, and 32.8% were non-families. 28.1% of all households were made up of individuals, and 18.8% had someone living alone who was 65 years of age or older. The average household size was 2.36 and the average family size was 2.91.

In the township the population was spread out, with 18.5% under the age of 18, 4.6% from 18 to 24, 24.5% from 25 to 44, 29.8% from 45 to 64, and 22.5% who were 65 years of age or older. The median age was 46 years. For every 100 females, there were 109.7 males. For every 100 females age 18 and over, there were 127.8 males.

The median income for a household in the township was $32,813, and the median income for a family was $45,000. Males had a median income of $25,833 versus $21,875 for females. The per capita income for the township was $17,270. There were 4.8% of families and 11.9% of the population living below the poverty line, including 19.0% of under eighteens and 16.7% of those over 64.

References

Townships in Pope County, Minnesota
Townships in Minnesota